Jesús Porfirio González Schmal (born 6 November 1942) is a Mexican lawyer and politician affiliated with the Convergence (formerly to the National Action Party and the Mexican Democratic Party. As of 2014 he served as Deputy of the LI, LII and LIX Legislature of the Mexican Congress as a plurinominal representative.

References

1942 births
Living people
Politicians from Torreón
Lawyers from Coahuila
Members of the Chamber of Deputies (Mexico)
National Action Party (Mexico) politicians
Mexican Democratic Party politicians
Citizens' Movement (Mexico) politicians
Universidad Iberoamericana alumni
National Autonomous University of Mexico alumni
20th-century Mexican politicians
21st-century Mexican politicians
Deputies of the LII Legislature of Mexico
Deputies of the LIX Legislature of Mexico